Quapaw Public Schools is a school district headquartered in Quapaw, Oklahoma. Its area includes, in addition to Quapaw, Cardin, Peoria, Picher, and Hockerville.

It includes an elementary school, a middle school, and a high school.

 David Carriger is the superintendent. He uses social media as a way of notifying parents and staff about developments in the district.

In 2009 Picher-Cardin Public Schools closed, and the Quapaw district took some of the students,  and property.

References

External links
 Quapaw Public Schools

School districts in Oklahoma
Education in Ottawa County, Oklahoma